Boerenjongens is a Dutch dish of raisins soaked in brandy. The name means "farmer boys" in Dutch. This recipe is especially popular with older Dutch people and traditionally consumed at holidays or birthdays. In the city of Groningen and other cities in the countryside like Enschede there is often boerenjongens-flavoured ice cream for sale.

In America, it is sometimes made with whiskey instead of brandy.

A variation to this recipe, apricots in brandewijn, is called boerenmeisjes.

References 

Dutch cuisine
Dutch words and phrases
Cuisine of Groningen (province)
Fruit dishes